The Inuyama Bridge is a bridge over the Kiso River in Japan. It is an laced steel truss bridge which connects Kakamigahara in the Gifu Prefecture with Inuyama in the Aichi Prefecture. 
Meitetsu Inuyama Line runs on it.

This bridge was a road-rail bridge before 2000 when a new road bridge was constructed at the lower stream side (west side) of this bridge.

Bridges in Japan
Railway bridges in Japan